Sandigliano is a comune (municipality) in the Province of Biella in the Italian region Piedmont, located about  northeast of Turin and about  southwest of Biella.

Sandigliano borders the following municipalities: Borriana, Cerrione, Gaglianico, Ponderano, Verrone.

Sandigliano was the birthplace of  Ottavio Ottavi, 19th century  agronomist and viticulturalist.

References

Cities and towns in Piedmont